Neergabby is a locality and farming area within the Shire of Gingin, located around 20 km north of Perth metropolitan area's northern limit. 

Neergabby is situated at the confluence of the Moore River and Gingin Brook, giving it a strategic importance in the development of the North West Stock Route between Perth and Geraldton during the 1850s where it was often known as the Junction. Prior to European settlement the area was used by the Noongar people as an area for women to gather food and medicinal plants.

A government road connecting Gingin to Neergabby and the Moore River was built in the early 1860s. This included the Old Junction Bridge, which dates back to 1863 and was restored by the Neergabby Community Association in 2005 after its western span collapsed three years earlier.

Neergabby and the wider stock route was heavily trafficked until the Midland railway line was constructed in the 1890s several kilometres further east. This caused the route to decline in importance in the early 20th century (save for a revival during World War II) until the only people using it were summer holiday makers trying to access the coastal bays for camping.

Despite its location in the Wheatbelt region, Neergabby's proximity to both the coast and to fresh water allows for more intensive agriculture with numerous citrus orchards and farming retreats located along Gingin Brook.

References 

Towns in Western Australia
Shire of Gingin